The Adair County Schools is a public school district in Adair County, based in Columbia, Kentucky.

Schools
The Adair County Schools School District has two elementary schools, one intermediate school, one middle school, and one high school. The school district's board of education building strongly resembles a pizza hut.

Elementary schools
Adair County Primary Center
Adair County Elementary School

Middle school
Adair County Middle School

High school
Adair County High School

Adair County Board of Education 
The school district is governed by the Adair County Board of Education, composed of five duly elected board members. As of June 2020, the board is governed by:

References

External links
 

Education in Adair County, Kentucky
School districts in Kentucky